Talmine is a crofting and fishing township, overlooking Talmine Bay, an inlet on the western shore of Tongue Bay  in northern Sutherland, Scottish Highlands and is in the Scottish council area of Highland. The Shamrock, a 19th-century sloop located within the bay, is protected by Royal Commission on the Ancient and Historical Monuments of Scotland. She can be seen in the photo to the right, on the beach, underneath/between the stone building and blue car roughly centre image.

The township is located 2 miles from the nearest main road, the A838 and is about 4 miles from Tongue, the nearest decently sized town. It is located directly north of Midtown and Directly South of Midfield and Achininver.

References

External links
A great image of the Shamrock
More photos of the bay and the Shamrock

Populated places in Sutherland